The Paul Robeson House was the home of internationally renowned American bass-baritone concert singer, actor of film and stage, All-American and professional athlete, writer, multi-lingual orator, human rights activist, and lawyer Paul Robeson from 1966 until 1976.  Located in West Philadelphia, the Robeson House produces, presents and promotes traveling lectures, concerts and exhibits so that learning about Robeson is accessible to all ages and cultures.

Background
Robeson lived in the Walnut Hill neighborhood of West Philadelphia from 1966 until 1976, with his sister Marian Forsythe.  In declining health, Robeson spent his time in Philadelphia in retirement. He refused most interviews, and saw only family and a few friends.

In 1998 the West Philadelphia Cultural Alliance, under the direction of Ms. Frances Aulston, initiated a major campaign to restore the Paul Robeson House. Since then, the Pennsylvania Historical Museum Commission and the White House have officially recognized the museum as a national historic preservation site.

The Paul Robeson House is an Official Project of Save America's Treasures public-private partnership between the White House Millennium Council and the National Trust for Historic Preservation of our nation's irreplaceable historic and cultural treasures for future generations.

It was declared a National Historic Landmark in 2000. The "House" produces lectures, concerts and exhibits to promote Robeson's legacy.

References

External links

Paul Robeson
National Historic Landmarks in Pennsylvania
Houses on the National Register of Historic Places in Philadelphia
Robeson
Biographical museums in Pennsylvania
African-American museums in Pennsylvania
Spruce Hill, Philadelphia